The following is a list of winners and shortlisted authors of the Booker Prize for Fiction. The prize has been awarded each year since 1969 to the best original full-length novel, written in the English language, by a citizen of the Commonwealth of Nations or the Republic of Ireland. In 2014, it was opened for the first time to any work published in the United Kingdom and written in (not translated into) the English language.

There have been three special awards celebrating the Booker's history. In 1993, the "Booker of Bookers" prize was awarded to Salman Rushdie for Midnight's Children (the 1981 winner) as the best novel to win the award in its first 25 years. Midnight's Children also won a public vote in 2008, on the prize's fortieth anniversary, for "The Best of the Booker". In 2018 a special "Golden Booker" was awarded celebrating 50 years of the award; this was won by Michael Ondaatje for The English Patient.

Winners, shortlists and longlists 

*  Awarded in 2010 as the Lost Man Booker Prize

Writers with multiple awards 
Five authors have won the award twice:
J. M. Coetzee
Peter Carey
J. G. Farrell
Hilary Mantel
Margaret Atwood

Writers with multiple nominations 
The following writers have received two or more nominations:

7 nominations
Salman Rushdie

6 nominations

Margaret Atwood
J. M. Coetzee
Ian McEwan
Iris Murdoch

5 nominations

Beryl Bainbridge
Peter Carey
Kazuo Ishiguro
David Mitchell
William Trevor

4 nominations

Julian Barnes
Sebastian Barry
Anita Desai
Penelope Fitzgerald
Howard Jacobson
Thomas Keneally
Hilary Mantel
Ali Smith
Colm Toibin
Barry Unsworth

3 nominations

Kingsley Amis
John Banville
Nicola Barker
Andre Brink
Michael Frayn
Damon Galgut
Nadine Gordimer
Alan Hollinghurst
James Kelman
Doris Lessing
Deborah Levy
Penelope Lively
Jon McGregor
Rohinton Mistry
Timothy Mo
Brian Moore
Andrew O'Hagan
V. S. Naipaul
Richard Powers
Zadie Smith
Muriel Spark
Graham Swift
Sarah Waters

2 nominations

Martin Amis
Tash Aw
Paul Bailey
Nina Bawden
John Berger
Carol Birch
William Boyd
Melvyn Bragg
Anita Brookner
NoViolet Bulawayo
A. S. Byatt
J. L. Carr
Jim Crace
Rachel Cusk
Roddy Doyle
Esi Edugyan
Robert Edric
Tan Twan Eng
J. G. Farrell
Karen Joy Fowler
Linda Grant
Abdulrazak Gurnah
Sarah Hall
Mohsin Hamid
Shirley Hazzard
Philip Hensher
Mary Lawson
David Lodge
Patrick McCabe
Colum McCann
Tom McCarthy
Shena Mackay
Chigozie Obioma
Michael Ondaatje
Joseph O'Neill
Tim Parks
Caryl Phillips
Julian Rathbone
Mordecai Richler
Arundhati Roy
Bernice Rubens
Donal Ryan
Sunjeev Sahota
Will Self
Carol Shields
David Storey
Elizabeth Strout
Rose Tremain
Anne Tyler
Marina Warner
Tim Winton

Notes

References

External links 
 
 Full details of the winners, judges and shortlisted books for all the Booker prizes (1969–2008), The Guardian, 10 October 2008.

 
Booker Prize for Fiction
+List
Booker Prize Winners
Booker Prize